Marlo Carmen Colette Sweatman (born 1 December 1994) is an American-born Jamaican footballer who plays as a midfielder for Hungarian club Szent Mihály FC and the Jamaica women's national team.

Club career
Sweatman signed to play in Hungary with Viktória FC Szombathely.

International career
Sweatman plays internationally for Jamaica.

International goals
Scores and results list Jamaica's goal tally first

References 

1994 births
Living people
Citizens of Jamaica through descent
Jamaican women's footballers
Women's association football midfielders
PEC Zwolle (women) players
Eredivisie (women) players
Jamaica women's international footballers
2019 FIFA Women's World Cup players
Jamaican expatriate women's footballers
Jamaican expatriate sportspeople in Sweden
Expatriate women's footballers in Sweden
Jamaican expatriate sportspeople in the Netherlands
Expatriate women's footballers in the Netherlands
Jamaican expatriate sportspeople in Hungary
Expatriate women's footballers in Hungary
Jamaican people of American descent
People from Herndon, Virginia
Sportspeople from Fairfax County, Virginia
Soccer players from Virginia
American women's soccer players
Florida State Seminoles women's soccer players
Oregon Ducks women's soccer players
American expatriate women's soccer players
American expatriate sportspeople in Sweden
American expatriate sportspeople in the Netherlands
American expatriate sportspeople in Hungary
African-American women's soccer players
American sportspeople of Jamaican descent
21st-century African-American sportspeople
21st-century African-American women